Miguel Santisteban (born 22 February 1960) is a Mexican swimmer. He competed in two events at the 1980 Summer Olympics.

References

1960 births
Living people
Mexican male swimmers
Olympic swimmers of Mexico
Swimmers at the 1980 Summer Olympics
Place of birth missing (living people)